Martín García and Luis Horna were the defending champions, but did not participate this year.

Alberto Martín and Fernando Vicente won in the final 6–4, 6–3, against Lucas Arnold Ker and Christopher Kas.

Seeds

Draw

Draw

External links
Draw

Dutch Open (tennis)
2006 ATP Tour
2006 Dutch Open (tennis)